Lupane State University (LSU) was established in 2005 in Lupane, Zimbabwe.

Facilities 

Agriculture

Business Management

Arts

References

External links 
 Lupane State University website

Universities and colleges in Zimbabwe
Buildings and structures in Matabeleland North Province
Education in Matabeleland North Province
Educational institutions established in 2005
2005 establishments in Zimbabwe